Meramec Township is an inactive township in Jefferson County, in the U.S. state of Missouri.

Meramec Township was established in 1821, taking its name from the Meramec River.

References

Townships in Missouri
Townships in Jefferson County, Missouri